Peter de Sarigny (1911-1999) was a South African film producer who worked mostly in Britain. He was a former journalist who served in the RAF during World War Two. He worked for a number of years with the Boulting Brothers, then for the Rank Organisation.

Selected credits
Fame Is the Spur (1947)
Brighton Rock (1948)
The Guinea Pig (1948)
Seven Days to Noon (1950)
Malta Story (1953)
Simba (1955)
True as a Turtle (1957)
Never Let Go (1960)
Waltz of the Toreadors (1962)

References

External links

1911 births
1999 deaths
British film producers